Ephraim Kamuntu is a Ugandan management scientist and politician. He is the Minister of Justice and Constitutional Affairs in the Cabinet of Uganda. He was appointed to that position on 14 December 2019. Previously he served as Minister of Water and Environment from August 2012 to June 2016. He is also an ex-officio Member of the Parliament of Uganda because of his Cabinet position.

Background and education
Ephraim Kamuntu was born in Sheema District on 26 September 1945. He attended Ntare School for both his O-Level (1962-1965) and his A-Level (1966-1967) education. He studied at Makerere University, Uganda's oldest university, graduating in 1971 with a Bachelor of Arts in economics, political science, and history. In 1973, he obtained a Master of Science in systems analysis from the University of Rochester, in New York State. He also earned a Master of Arts in management science and business administration, from the University of Massachusetts.

Career
At some point after Idi Amin took power in Uganda in 1971, Kamuntu became part of the exile-based Save Uganda Movement, a militant group attempting to overthrow Amin. Kamuntu lectured at Nairobi University in 1978. He lectured in Makerere University's Faculty of Commerce before it was shifted to the current Makerere University Business School in Nakawa. From 1992 until 1995, Kamuntu served as the chairman and managing director of Nile Bank Limited, a private commercial bank in Uganda. Between 1995 and 1997, he worked as a private consultant. From 1997 until 2001, he served as the National Coordinator for the Private Sector Development Program of the Ugandan Government. He entered politics in 2001, contesting for the parliamentary seat of Sheema County South, Bushenyi District. He was elected and was re-elected in 2006.

On 1 June 2006, he was appointed Minister of State for Industry. On 16 February 2009, he was reassigned as State Minister of Finance for Planning. In the cabinet reshuffle of 27 May 2011, he was promoted to full cabinet minister and put in charge of the Ministry of Tourism, Wildlife and Heritage, serving in that position until he was appointed as Minister of Water and Environment on 15 August 2012. Kamuntu was moved to the post of Minister of Tourism, Wildlife and Antiquities on 6 June 2016.

Personal details
Ephraim Kamuntu was married to Ida Kamuntu, who died in May 2015.

References

External links
 Website of the Parliament of Uganda
 Minister Ephraim Kamuntu: Ministry Promoting Unique Tourism Attractions - 12 September 2012

1945 births
Living people
People from Sheema District
National Resistance Movement politicians
Makerere University alumni
University of Rochester alumni
People from Western Region, Uganda
University of Massachusetts alumni
People educated at Ntare School
Government ministers of Uganda
Members of the Parliament of Uganda
21st-century Ugandan politicians
Save Uganda Movement